Sergei Ivanovich Berezin (born 29 February 1960) is a Russian professional football coach and a former player.

External links
  Career profile at KLISF

1960 births
Living people
Soviet footballers
PFC CSKA Moscow players
Russian football managers
FC Volgar Astrakhan managers
FC Sodovik Sterlitamak managers
FC SKA-Khabarovsk players
FC Spartak Moscow players
Association football forwards